Anti-Christian sentiment or Christophobia constitutes the fear of, hatred of, or prejudice against Christians, the Christian religion, and/or its practices. Anti-Christian sentiment is sometimes referred to as Christophobia or Christianophobia, although these terms actually encompass "every form of discrimination and intolerance against Christians", according to the Council of European Episcopal Conferences.

Antiquity
Anti-Christian sentiment began in the Roman Empire during the first century. The steady growth of the Christian movement was viewed with suspicion by both the authorities and the people of Rome. This led to the persecution of Christians in the Roman Empire. During the second century, Christianity was viewed as a negative movement in two ways. The first way encompasses the accusations which were made against adherents of the Christian faith in accordance with the principles which were held by the Roman population. The second way encompasses the supplementary controversy which was aroused during the intellectual age.

Anti-Christian sentiment is visible in the New Testament, and it seems to have been anticipated by Jesus of Nazareth, as it was documented by the writers of the gospels. The anti-Christian sentiment of the first century was not just expressed by the Roman authorities, it was also expressed by the Jews. Because Christianity was a sect which was largely emerging from Judaism at that time, this sentiment was the anger of an established religion towards a new and revolutionary faith. Paul of Tarsus, who persecuted Christians before he became a Christian, highlighted the Crucifixion of Jesus as a 'stumbling block' to the Jews, and the belief that the messiah would have died on a cross was offensive to some of the Jews because they awaited a messiah who had different characteristics.

Early modern period

At the time of the Reformation, Anti Christian sentiment grew with the rise of atheism. During the Reign of Terror, a period of the French revolution, radical revolutionaries and their supporters desired a cultural revolution that would rid the French state of all Christian influence. In 1789, church lands were expropriated and priests killed or forced to leave France. Later in 1792, "refractory priests" were targeted and replaced with their secular counterpart from the Jacobin club. Anti-Christian sentiments increased during 1793 and a campaign of dechristianization occurred, and new forms of moral religion emerged, including the deistic Cult of the Supreme Being and the atheistic Cult of Reason. The drownings at Nantes targeted many Catholic priests and nuns. The first drownings happened on the night of 16 November 1793. The victims were 160 arrested Catholic priests that were labeled "refractory clergy" by the National Convention.

Late modern period

Many Christians were persecuted and/or killed during the Armenian genocide, Greek genocide, and Assyrian genocide. Benny Morris and Dror Ze'evi argue that the Armenian genocide and other contemporaneous persecution of Christians in the Ottoman Empire (Greek genocide, and Assyrian genocide) constitute an extermination campaign, or genocide, carried out by the Ottoman Empire against its Christian subjects.

The Cristero War was a widespread struggle in central and western Mexico in response to the implementation of secularist and anticlerical articles. The rebellion was instigated as a response to an executive decree by Mexican President Plutarco Elías Calles to strictly enforce Article 130 of the Constitution, a decision known as Calles Law. Calles sought to eliminate the power of the Catholic Church in Mexico, its affiliated organizations and to suppress popular religiosity. To help enforce the law, Calles seized Church properties, expelled foreign priests, and closed monasteries, convents, and religious schools. Some have characterized Calles as the leader of an atheist state and his program as being one to eradicate religion in Mexico. Tomás Garrido Canabal led persecutions against the Church in his state, Tabasco, killing many priests and laymen and driving the remainder underground.

The Red Terror in Spain committed various acts of violence that included the desecration and burning of monasteries, convents, and churches. The failed coup of July 1936 set loose a violent onslaught on those that revolutionaries in the Republican zone identified as enemies; "where the rebellion failed, for several months afterwards merely to be identified as a priest, a religious, or simply a militant Christian or member of some apostolic or pious organization, was enough for a person to be executed without trial".

Throughout the history of the Soviet Union (1917–1991), there were periods when Soviet authorities brutally suppressed and persecuted various forms of Christianity to different extents depending on State interests. The state advocated the destruction of religion, and to achieve this goal, it officially denounced religious beliefs as superstitious and backward. The Communist Party destroyed churches, ridiculed, harassed, incarcerated and executed religious leaders, flooded the schools and media with anti-religious teachings, and it introduced a belief system called "scientific atheism", with its own rituals, promises and proselytizers. According to some sources, the total number of Christian victims under the Soviet regime has been estimated to range around 12 to 20 million. At least 106,300 Russian clergymen were executed between 1937 and 1941.

Contemporary

Persecution of Christians in the post–Cold War era refers to the persecution of Christians from 1989 to the present, which is taking place in Africa, the Americas, Europe, Asia and Middle East.

Christians are persecuted widely across the Arab and Islamic world. Muslim-majority nations in which Christian populations have suffered acute discrimination, persecution, repression, violence and in some cases death, mass murder or ethnic cleansing include; Iraq, Iran, Syria, Pakistan, Afghanistan, Saudi Arabia, Yemen, Somalia, Qatar, Kuwait, Indonesia, Malaysia, the Maldives. Native Christian communities are subjected to persecution in several Muslim-majority countries such as Egypt and Pakistan.

The persecution of Christians in North Korea is ongoing and systematic. According to the Christian organization Open Doors, North Korea persecutes Christians more than any other country in the world.

The issue of Christianophobia in the UK was debated on 5 December 2007 in the House of Commons.

Even Hollywood Industry is considered to be biased against Christianity. Actor Rainn Wilson  accused Hollywood of anti-Christian bias for portraying Christian pastors as horrific villians. In the postpandemic surival drama The Last of Us (TV series), a Christian pastor was shown quoting from the Bible to justify cannibalism.

See also 

 Persecution of Christians in the post–Cold War era
 Persecution of Christians in the Roman Empire
 Persecution of Christians in the Soviet Union
 Criticism of Christianity
 Persecution of Christians
 Eagle catching Fish
 Anti-Catholicism
 Anti-Mormonism
 Anti-Protestantism
 Persecution of Eastern Orthodox Christians
 Persecution of Jehovah's Witnesses
 Black metal

References

 
Anti-Catholicism
Anti-Eastern Orthodoxy
Anti-Protestantism